Österreich I   is an Austrian television series first airing in 1989, starring Austrian journalist Hugo Portisch.

See also
List of Austrian television series

External links
 

1989 Austrian television series debuts
1989 Austrian television series endings
1980s Austrian television series
ORF (broadcaster)
German-language television shows